Andrei Vittenberg (born September 30, 1965) is a Russian-born French former professional ice hockey forward.

Vittenberg played in the Soviet Hockey League for Torpedo Yaroslavl before moving to France in 1991 to sign for Dragons de Rouen. In 1993, he joined Brest Albatros Hockey and played for four seasons until his retirement in 1997.

During his spell in France, Vittenberg became a French citizen and played in the 1994 Men's World Ice Hockey Championships for the France national team.

References

External links

1965 births
Living people
Brest Albatros Hockey players
Dragons de Rouen players
French ice hockey forwards
Lokomotiv Yaroslavl players
Russian ice hockey forwards
Ice hockey people from Moscow